Colossendeidae is a family of sea spider (class Pycnogonida). Like most sea spiders, species in this family have four pairs of legs, except for three species (Decolopoda australis, D. qasimi, and Pentacolossendeis reticulata) with five leg pairs, including the first polymerous (i.e., extra-legged) sea spider discovered (D. australis), and one giant species (Dodecolopoda mawsoni) that was the first sea spider discovered with six leg pairs.

Taxonomy

 Colossendeis Jarzinsky, 1870 (67 species)
 Colossendeis acuta Stiboy-Risch, 1993
 Colossendeis adelpha Child, 1998
 Colossendeis angusta Sars, 1877
 Colossendeis aperta Turpaeva, 2005
 Colossendeis arcuata A. Milne-Edwards, 1885
 Colossendeis australis Hodgson, 1907
 Colossendeis avida Pushkin, 1970
 Colossendeis belekurovi Pushkin, 1993
 Colossendeis bicincta Schimkewitsch, 1893
 Colossendeis brevirostris Child, 1995
 Colossendeis bruuni Fage, 1956
 Colossendeis clavata Meinert, 1899
 Colossendeis colossea Wilson, 1881
 Colossendeis concedis Child, 1995
 Colossendeis cucurbita Cole, 1909
 Colossendeis curtirostris Stock, 1963
 Colossendeis dalli Child, 1995
 Colossendeis drakei Calman, 1915
 Colossendeis elephantis Child, 1995
 Colossendeis enigmatica Turpaeva, 1974
 Colossendeis ensifer Child, 1995
 Colossendeis fijigrypos Bamber, 2004
 Colossendeis fragilis Pushkin, 1993
 Colossendeis gardineri Carpenter, 1907
 Colossendeis geoffroyi Mane-Garzon, 1944
 Colossendeis gibbosa Mobius, 1902
 Colossendeis glacialis Hodgson, 1907
 Colossendeis gracilis Hoek, 1881
 Colossendeis grassa Pushkin, 1993
 Colossendeis hoeki Gordon, 1944
 Colossendeis insolita Pushkin, 1993
 Colossendeis japonica Hoek, 1898
 Colossendeis korotkevitschi Pushkin, 1984
 Colossendeis kurtchatovi Turpaeva, 1993
 Colossendeis leninensis Pushkin, 1993
 Colossendeis leptorhynchus Hoek, 1881
 Colossendeis longirostris Gordon, 1938
 Colossendeis losinskii Turpaeva, 2002
 Colossendeis macerrima Wilson, 1881
 Colossendeis media Hoek, 1881
 Colossendeis megalonyx Fry & Hedgpeth, 1969
 Colossendeis melancholicus Stock, 1975
 Colossendeis mica Pushkin, 1970
 Colossendeis microsetosa Hilton, 1943
 Colossendeis minor Schimkewitsch, 1893
 Colossendeis minuta Hoek, 1881
 Colossendeis mycterismos Bamber, 2004
 Colossendeis nasuta Hedgpeth, 1949
 Colossendeis notialis Child 1995
 Colossendeis oculifera Stock, 1963
 Colossendeis peloria Child, 1994
 Colossendeis perforata Turpaeva, 1993
 Colossendeis pipetta Stock, 1991
 Colossendeis proboscidea (Sabine)
 Colossendeis robusta Hoek, 1881
 Colossendeis rostrata Turpaeva, 1994
 Colossendeis scoresbii Gordon, 1932
 Colossendeis scotti Calman, 1915
 Colossendeis sinuosa Stock, 1997
 Colossendeis spicula Child, 1994
 Colossendeis stramenti Fry and Hedgpeth, 1969
 Colossendeis subminuta Schimkewitsch, 1893
 Colossendeis tenera Hilton, 1943
 Colossendeis tenuipedis Pushkin, 1993
 Colossendeis tethya Turpaeva, 1974
 Colossendeis tortipalpis Gordon, 1932
 Colossendeis vityazi Turpaeva, 1973
 Colossendeis wilsoni Calman, 1915
 Decolopoda Eights, 1835
 Decolopoda australis Eights, 1835 — Scotia Sea (littoral)
 Decolopoda quasimi Sree, Sreepada & Parulekar, 1993
 Dodecolopoda Calman & Gordon, 1933
 Dodecolopoda mawsoni Calman & Gordon, 1933 — Scotia Sea
 Hedgpethia Turpaeva, 1973 (12 species)
 Pentacolossendeis Hedgpeth, 1943
 Pentacolossendeis reticulata Hedgpeth, 1943
 Rhopalorhynchus 
 Rhopalorhynchus cinclus Bamber, 2001 — Bodgaya Southern Rim Reef, Malaysia (on a sponge)
 Rhopalorhynchus claudus Stock, 1975 — Barbados (muddy sand, shell debris, sponge bottom)
 Rhopalorhynchus clavipes Carpenter, 1893 — Torres Strait (between reefs)
 Rhopalorhynchus filipes Stock, 1991 — between Loyalty Islands and New Caledonia, near Chesterfield Island
 Rhopalorhynchus gracillimus Carpenter, 1907 — Maldive Islands (on a black crinoid)
 Rhopalorhynchus kroeyeri Wood-Mason, 1873 — Andaman Islands (on the bottom of filamentous algae)
 Rhopalorhynchus lomani Stock, 1958 — Makassar Strait, Indonesia
 Rhopalorhynchus mortenseni Stock, 1958 — off Jolo, Sulu Archipelago (on sand and corals)
 Rhopalorhynchus pedunculatum Stock, 1957 — Red Sea (shore)
 Rhopalorhynchus sibogae Stock, 1958 — Flores Sea, Indonesia (on mud and sand)
 Rhopalorhynchus tenuissimus Haswell, 1884 — Port Denison, Australia

References

Sources
 PycnoBase: Taxon tree

Pycnogonids
Chelicerate families